"This Door Swings Both Ways" is a song written by Estelle Levitt and Don Thomas and performed by Herman's Hermits.  It reached #3 in Canada, #8 in New Zealand, #12 in the United States, #18 in the United Kingdom, and #38 in Australia in 1966.  It was featured on their 1966 album, Both Sides of Herman's Hermits.

The song was produced by Mickie Most.

Billboard described the single as an "easy-go rocker with unique instrumental backing and exceptional group vocal."

References

1966 songs
1966 singles
Herman's Hermits songs
Song recordings produced by Mickie Most
MGM Records singles